Paris Township may refer to:

 Paris Township, Edgar County, Illinois
 Paris Township, Howard County, Iowa
 Paris Township, Linn County, Kansas, in Linn County, Kansas
 Paris Township, Michigan, in Huron County
 Paris Township, Kent County, Michigan, now the city of Kentwood
 Paris Township, Stutsman County, North Dakota, in Stutsman County, North Dakota
 Paris Township, Portage County, Ohio
 Paris Township, Stark County, Ohio
 Paris Township, Union County, Ohio

	
Township name disambiguation pages